Seeing Double may refer to:

 Seeing Double (album), a 2002 album by S Club
 Seeing Double, a 2008 album by Duncan Lloyd
 Seeing Double (2003 film), a 2003 film starring S Club
 Seeing Double (1913 film), an American silent comedy film
 "Seeing Double" (song), a 1979 song by The Teardrops
 "Seein' Double", a 2014 song by Nikki Lane from All or Nothin'
 Double Dutchess: Seeing Double, a 2017 visual album by Fergie
 Diplopia or double vision, the simultaneous perception of two images of a single object

See also 
 Double vision (disambiguation)